Glaencorisa propinqua is a species of water boatman in the family Corixidae in the order Hemiptera.

References

Corixidae